Laos participated in the 15th Asian Games, officially known as the XV Asiad held in Doha, Qatar from December 1 to December 15, 2006. Laos ranked 33rd along with Turkmenistan with a lone silver medal in this edition of the Asiad.

Medalist

References

Nations at the 2006 Asian Games
2006
Asian Games